The 1955–56 Philadelphia Warriors season George Senesky took over for Eddie Gottlieb as coach, the Warriors had a strong start by winning 12 of their first 16 games. Paul Arizin and Neil Johnston were among the league's scoring leaders as the Warriors won the Eastern Division with a 45–27 record. The addition of rookie Tom Gola made the difference. In his first season Gola averaged 9.1 rebounds and 5.9 assists per game. In the Eastern Division Finals the Warriors beat the Syracuse Nationals in 5 games. In the NBA Finals, the Warriors won their 2nd Championship by beating the Fort Wayne Pistons 4 games to 1.

Roster

Regular season

Season standings

Record vs. opponents

Game log

Roster

Philadelphia Warriors 1955–56 NBA champions
 Arizin
 Beck
 Davis
 Dempsey
 George
 Gola
 Graboski
 Hennessy
 Johnston
 Moore
 Schafer
 Coach Senesky

Playoffs

|- align="center" bgcolor="#ccffcc"
| 1
| March 23
| Syracuse
| W 109–87
| Paul Arizin (29)
| Neil Johnston (24)
| Gola, Beck (5)
| Philadelphia Civic Center
| 1–0
|- align="center" bgcolor="#ffcccc"
| 2
| March 25
| @ Syracuse
| L 112–118
| Neil Johnston (43)
| Neil Johnston (16)
| Neil Johnston (7)
| Onondaga War Memorial
| 1–1
|- align="center" bgcolor="#ccffcc"
| 3
| March 27
| Syracuse
| W 119–96
| Joe Graboski (20)
| Neil Johnston (18)
| Tom Gola (10)
| Philadelphia Civic Center
| 2–1
|- align="center" bgcolor="#ffcccc"
| 4
| March 28
| @ Syracuse
| L 104–108
| Neil Johnston (35)
| Neil Johnston (12)
| Neil Johnston (7)
| Onondaga War Memorial
| 2–2
|- align="center" bgcolor="#ccffcc"
| 5
| March 29
| Syracuse
| W 109–104
| Paul Arizin (35)
| Neil Johnston (18)
| Neil Johnston (8)
| Philadelphia Civic Center
| 3–2
|-

|- align="center" bgcolor="#ccffcc"
| 1
| March 31
| Fort Wayne
| W 98–94
| Paul Arizin (28)
| Neil Johnston (14)
| Tom Gola (10)
| Philadelphia Civic Center4,128
| 1–0
|- align="center" bgcolor="#ffcccc"
| 2
| April 1
| @ Fort Wayne
| L 83–84
| Paul Arizin (27)
| Arizin, Johnston (9)
| Ernie Beck (6)
| War Memorial Coliseum6,976
| 1–1
|- align="center" bgcolor="#ccffcc"
| 3
| April 3
| Fort Wayne
| W 100–96
| Paul Arizin (27)
| Neil Johnston (14)
| Tom Gola (8)
| Philadelphia Civic Center11,698
| 2–1
|- align="center" bgcolor="#ccffcc"
| 4
| April 5
| @ Fort Wayne
| W 107–105
| Paul Arizin (30)
| Tom Gola (9)
| Joe Graboski (7)
| War Memorial Coliseum7,852
| 3–1
|- align="center" bgcolor="#ccffcc"
| 5
| April 7
| Fort Wayne
| W 99–88
| Joe Graboski (29)
| Joe Graboski (16)
| Jack George (10)
| Philadelphia Civic Center11,194
| 4–1
|-

Awards and honors
 Paul Arizin, NBA All-Star Game
 Neil Johnston, NBA All-Star Game
 Neil Johnston, All-NBA First Team
 Paul Arizin, All-NBA First Team
 Jack George, All-NBA Second Team

References

 Warriors on Basketball Reference

Philadelphia
Golden State Warriors seasons
NBA championship seasons